Rattanai Songsangchan (born 10 June 1995) simply known as Pure is a Thai professional footballer who plays as a goalkeeper for Thai League 1 club Port.

International career
In 2016 Rattanai was selected in Thailand U23 squad for 2016 AFC U-23 Championship in Qatar.

Honours

Club
Thai Airways-Look Isan 
 Regional League Eastern Division (1): 2013
Port
 Thai FA Cup (1): 2019

External links
 Rattanai Songsangchan profile at Port website
 

Living people
1995 births
Rattanai Songsangchan
Rattanai Songsangchan
Association football goalkeepers
Rattanai Songsangchan
Rattanai Songsangchan
Rattanai Songsangchan
Rattanai Songsangchan
Rattanai Songsangchan